Ronald Antonio O'Sullivan  (born 5 December 1975) is an English professional snooker player who is the current world champion and world number one. Widely recognised as one of the most talented and accomplished players in the sport's history, he has won the World Snooker Championship seven times, a modern-era record he holds jointly with Stephen Hendry. He has also won a record seven Masters and a record seven UK Championship titles for a total of 21 Triple Crown titles, the most achieved by any player. He holds the record for the most ranking titles, with 39, and has been world number one on multiple occasions.

After an impressive amateur career, O'Sullivan turned professional in 1992, aged 16. He won his first professional ranking event at the 1993 UK Championship aged 17 years and 358 days, making him the youngest player to win a ranking title, a record he still holds. He is also the youngest player to win the Masters, which he first achieved in 1995, aged 19 years and 69 days. Now noted for his longevity in the sport, he has made a record equalling 30 appearances in the final stages of the World Snooker Championship at the Crucible. He became the oldest world champion in snooker history when he won his seventh title in 2022, aged 46 years and 148 days.

O'Sullivan made his first competitive century break at age 10 and his first competitive maximum break at age 15. He is the only player to have achieved 1,000 century breaks in professional competition, a milestone he reached in 2019 and which he has since extended to over 1,100 centuries. He has made the highest number of officially recognised maximum breaks in professional competition, with 15, and holds the Guinness World Record for the fastest competitive maximum break, compiled in a time of 5 minutes and 8 seconds at the 1997 World Championship.  

Known as a controversial and outspoken figure on the professional tour, O'Sullivan has struggled during his career with depression, mood swings, and drug and alcohol abuse. He has been disciplined multiple times by the World Professional Billiards and Snooker Association for his behaviour and comments. Outside his playing career, he works as a pundit for Eurosport's snooker coverage. He has written crime novels, autobiographies, and a health and fitness book. He stars in the 2017 miniseries Ronnie O'Sullivan's American Hustle, which features him competing against pool hustlers in the United States, as well as in the 2022 documentary Seventh Heaven, which documents his career through his seventh world title. He was awarded an OBE in 2016.

Career summary 

O'Sullivan began playing snooker at age 7 and soon became a noted amateur competitor, winning his first club tournament at age 9, making his first competitive century break at age 10, and winning the British Under-16 Championship at age 13. At the 1991 English Amateur Championship, aged 15 years and 98 days, he made his first competitive maximum break, then the youngest player ever to do so in a recognised tournament. In the same year, he won the IBSF World Under-21 Snooker Championship and Junior Pot Black.

After turning professional in 1992, aged 16, he won 74 of his first 76 qualifying matches, including a record 38 consecutive professional victories. He qualified for the televised stages of the 1993 World Championship, losing 7–10 to Alan McManus on his Crucible debut. He claimed his first ranking title later that year, beating Hendry 10–6 in the final of the 1993 UK Championship seven days before his 18th birthday to become the youngest ever winner of a ranking event, a record he still holds. The following season, he won the 1995 Masters aged 19 years and 69 days. He is the youngest Masters champion in history.

Between 1996 and 1999, O'Sullivan reached three world semi-finals in four years. At the 1997 World Championship, he achieved his first maximum break in professional competition; compiled in a time of 5 minutes and 8 seconds, it remains the fastest competitive maximum break in snooker history, which is listed as a Guinness World Record. He won his second UK title later that year at the 1997 UK Championship. Despite these successes, his career also became marred by controversy in the later 1990s. During the 1996 World Championship, he assaulted an assistant press officer, for which he received a suspended two-year ban and a £20,000 fine. After winning the 1998 Irish Masters, he was stripped of his title and prize money when a post-match drug test found evidence of cannabis in his system. O'Sullivan subsequently acknowledged frequent abuse of drugs and alcohol in the early years of his career, which resulted in spells in the Priory Hospital for rehabilitation.

He reached his first world final in 2001, where he defeated John Higgins 18–14 to claim his first world title and reach number two in the world rankings. He won his third UK Championship later that year, which helped him attain the world number one ranking for the first time in the 2002/2003 season. With veteran six-time world champion Ray Reardon acting as his coach and mentor, he won his second world title at the 2004 World Championship, defeating Graeme Dott 18–8 in the final, after which he held the number one ranking for the next two seasons. He added his second Masters title in 2005, ten years after his first. His behaviour became notably erratic in the mid-2000s as he battled clinical depression. During the 2005 World Championship, he shaved his head mid-tournament and exhibited what The Independent called a "public emotional disintegration" while losing 11 of the last 14 frames in his quarter-final against Peter Ebdon. At the 2005 UK Championship, he sat with a wet towel draped over his head during his match against Mark King. Trailing Hendry 1–4 in their best-of-17-frames quarter-final at the 2006 UK Championship, he abruptly conceded the match during the sixth frame and left the arena. Hendry was awarded the match 9–1 and O'Sullivan was fined £20,800 over the incident.

In 2007, O'Sullivan won his third Masters title and his fourth UK Championship, his first ranking title in almost three years. He won his third world title in 2008, defeating Ali Carter 18–8 in the final, after which he held the world number one ranking for the next two seasons. He added his fourth Masters title in 2009. After two poor seasons that saw him fall out of the top ten in the world rankings for the first time, he began working with psychiatrist Steve Peters in 2011. A resurgent O'Sullivan captured his fourth World Championship in 2012, again defeating Carter in the final, after which he paid tribute to Peters's work with him. The following season, he took an extended break from the professional tour. Despite playing only one competitive match all season, he returned to the Crucible for the 2013 World Championship and successfully defended his world title, defeating Barry Hawkins 18–12 in the final. In his 2014 Masters quarter-final against Ricky Walden, he set a new record for the most points without reply in professional competition, with 556, and went on to beat the defending champion Mark Selby 10–4 in the final to claim his fifth Masters title. At the 2014 World Championship, he reached a third consecutive world final, where he again faced Selby. Despite taking a 10–5 lead, O'Sullivan lost 14–18, his first defeat in a world final. Later in 2014, he won his fifth UK Championship, beating Judd Trump 10–9 in the final, although he declined to defend his UK title the following year, citing debilitating insomnia. At the 2015 Masters, he made his 776th century break in professional competition, surpassing Hendry's record for the most career centuries.

He won consecutive Masters in 2016 and 2017 for a record seven Masters titles. He won consecutive UK Championships in 2017 and 2018 for a record seven UK titles and a total of 19 titles in the Triple Crown Series, surpassing Hendry's total of 18. During the 2017–18 season, he won five ranking events. In the last frame of the 2019 Players Championship final, he made his 1,000th century break in professional competition, becoming the first player to reach that milestone. At the 2019 Tour Championship, he won his 36th ranking title, equalling Hendry's record and attaining the world number one ranking for the first time since May 2010.

At the 2020 World Championship, he came from 14–16 behind in his semi-final against Selby to win 17–16; he then defeated Kyren Wilson 18–8 in the final to win his sixth world title. The tournament also marked his 28th consecutive Crucible appearance, surpassing the 27 consecutive appearances made by Hendry. At the 2021 Tour Championship, he reached 1,100 century breaks in professional competition, and also reached his 58th ranking final, breaking Hendry's record of 57 ranking final appearances. O'Sullivan lost five consecutive ranking finals in the 2020–21 season, but he ended a 16-month title drought by winning his 38th ranking title at the 2021 World Grand Prix.

At the 2022 World Championship, O'Sullivan made his 30th Crucible appearance, equalling Steve Davis's record. He defeated Trump 18–13 in the final to win his seventh world title, equalling Hendry for the most world titles in the modern era. Aged 46 years and 148 days, he became the oldest world champion in snooker history, surpassing Reardon, who was 45 years and 203 days when he won his last title in 1978. O'Sullivan also surpassed Hendry's record of 70 Crucible wins, setting a new record of 74.

In 2022, O'Sullivan defeated Marco Fu 6–4 to win the Hong Kong Masters. The final was played before an estimated 9,000 spectators, the largest audience ever to attend a snooker match.

O'Sullivan's other career highlights include four Welsh Open titles, four Shanghai Masters titles, four Champion of Champions titles, and two China Open titles.

Playing style 

Known for his fast and attacking style of play, O'Sullivan gained the nickname "The Rocket" after winning a best-of-nine frame match in a record 43 minutes during his debut season as a professional. A prolific breakbuilder and solid tactical player, he has stated his disdain for long, drawn-out games, saying that they harm the game of snooker. When he first displayed this left-handed ability in the 1996 World Championship against Alain Robidoux, the Canadian accused him of disrespect and refused to shake hands after the match.

Status 
O'Sullivan is highly regarded in the sport, with several of his peers regarding him as the greatest player ever  and some labelling him a "genius".  After losing 6–17 to O'Sullivan in the 2008 World Championship semi-finals, Hendry described him as "the best player in the world by a country mile" at that point in time. O'Sullivan himself has dismissed the suggestion that he is the greatest player and has identified Hendry as the greatest due to his domination of the sport.

O'Sullivan sometimes lacks confidence or interest, and he has performed inconsistently throughout his career, with observers noting the "two Ronnies" aspect of his character.

One of the most popular players on the circuit, he is noted for being a "showman", and has helped improve the image of snooker with the general public. He has often been compared with Alex Higgins and Jimmy White because of his natural talent and popularity.

In December 2020, O'Sullivan was nominated for the BBC's Sports Personality of the Year Award, becoming the first snooker player to receive a nomination since Hendry in 1990. O'Sullivan was nominated for a second time in December 2022.

Criticisms of the sport 
After Barry Hearn took charge of World Snooker in 2010, O'Sullivan became a vocal critic of how Hearn reconfigured the professional tour. He took issue with increased travel expectations, flat 128 draws that required top professionals to play more rounds against lower ranked opponents, reduced prize money for 147 breaks, and tournament venues he saw as inadequate. He accused snooker's governing body of bullying and intimidating him, claimed that Hearn was running a "dictatorship", protested alleged mistreatment by snooker's authorities by giving robotic or monosyllabic responses in interviews, and refused opportunities to make maximum breaks in apparent protest over inadequate prize money for the achievement. In 2018, he threatened to form a breakaway snooker tour akin to the split in darts.

During the 2020 World Championship, O'Sullivan publicly criticised the standard of new players coming into snooker, stating that he would have to "lose an arm and a leg to fall out of the top 50". He was also critical of the tournament organisers' decision to allow fans into the World Championship final during the COVID-19 pandemic.

In 2021, O'Sullivan claimed on a podcast interview that most snooker players had wasted their lives. He called snooker a "bad sport" that can cause "a lot of damage", suggesting that the antisocial nature of solitary practice in a darkened environment can stunt players' personal development. He stated that he would not support his own children if they chose to become snooker players, and said that if he could live his sporting career over again, he would pursue golf or Formula One instead.

Other endeavours

Broadcaster 
In 2015 and 2016, O'Sullivan co-hosted the Midweek Matchzone show with Chris Hood on Brentwood radio station Phoenix FM.

In March 2014, Eurosport signed an exclusive deal with O'Sullivan to make him its global ambassador for snooker, with the goal of driving the sport's international appeal. As part of the deal, O'Sullivan created an exclusive snooker series for the network called The Ronnie O'Sullivan Show, which included his insights into the game, interviews with other professional players, and playing tips. He also wrote for Yahoo! websites and mobile apps during the World Championship. O'Sullivan frequently appears as a pundit on Eurosport's snooker coverage alongside Jimmy White and Neal Foulds. He also starred in a miniseries Ronnie O'Sullivan's American Hustle touring the United States with broadcasting friend Matt Smith. The series showed the pair travelling to different cities in the US learning the art of pool hustling.

Author 

O'Sullivan has written three crime novels in collaboration with author Emlyn Rees: Framed (2016), Double Kiss (2017), and The Break (2018). Although the novels are not autobiographical, they are loosely based on his early experiences and family life. He has also written two autobiographies: his first, Ronnie: The Autobiography of Ronnie O'Sullivan, was published in 2003; and his second, Running: The Autobiography, was published in 2013.

O'Sullivan has also coauthored a health and fitness book with nutritionist Rhiannon Lambert entitled Top of Your Game: Eating for Mind and Body. Published in 2019, it contains healthy recipes and advice for "living better, eating healthier and feeding your brain to enhance your performance".

Video games
O'Sullivan has been involved with several video games, including his own Ronnie O'Sullivan's Snooker, World Snooker Championship 2007 in 2007, and Virtual Snooker in 1996.

Personal life 
O'Sullivan was born on 5 December 1975 in Wordsley, West Midlands, the son of Ronald John and Maria (née Catalano) O'Sullivan, who ran a string of sex shops in the Soho area of London. His mother is originally from Sicily, and O'Sullivan spent childhood holidays in the village near Agrigento where she grew up. He was brought up in the Manor Road area of Chigwell, Essex, where he still lives. He is a first cousin of snooker player Maria Catalano, who has been ranked number one in the women's game. In 1992 his father was sentenced to life in prison for murder and was released in 2010 after serving 18 years. His mother was sentenced to a year in prison for tax evasion in 1996, leaving O'Sullivan to care for his eight-year-old sister Danielle.

O'Sullivan has three children: Taylor-Ann Magnus (born 1996) from a two-year relationship with Sally Magnus, and Lily (born 2006) and Ronnie Jr (born 2007) from a relationship with Jo Langley, whom he met at Narcotics Anonymous. He became a grandfather in October 2018 after Taylor-Ann gave birth to a daughter. He began dating actress Laila Rouass in 2012, and became engaged to her in 2013. Rouass announced on social media in February 2022 that they had ended their ten-year relationship, but the couple later reconciled.

He is known for his perfectionism and for being highly self-critical, even in victory. Early in his career, he was treated for drug-related issues and bouts of depression. Since 2011, psychiatrist and sports psychologist Steve Peters, a close friend, has helped him overcome his mood swings. He is also a close friend of artist Damien Hirst. Noted for repeatedly declaring his intention to retire, O'Sullivan took an extended break from the professional snooker tour during the 2012–13 season, during which he worked on a pig farm for several weeks. He enjoys running, and has achieved a personal best of 34 minutes and 54 seconds for 10 km races, which ranked him in the top 1,500 10 km runners in the UK in 2008. He enjoys cooking, and appeared on the BBC's Saturday Kitchen in December 2014 and February 2021. He also enjoys motor racing, and has appeared on season 4 of Top Gear. He is a supporter of Arsenal FC.

Despite a self-professed interest in Islam, O'Sullivan denied media reports that said he had converted to the religion in 2003. He has also espoused an interest in Buddhism, having spent many lunchtimes at the London Buddhist Centre in Bethnal Green. He has said he does not have a firm commitment to any religion.

O'Sullivan was awarded an OBE in the New Year Honours list in 2016, for services to snooker.

Performance and rankings timeline

Career finals

Ranking finals: 61 (39 titles)

Minor-ranking finals: 6 (3 titles)

Non-ranking finals: 55 (36 titles)

Pro–am finals: 1 (1 title)

Team finals: 3 (3 titles)

Amateur finals: 5 (3 titles)

Maximum and century breaks

Ronnie O'Sullivan has completed 15 maximum breaks from his first in the 1997 World Snooker Championship against Mick Price to his 2018 English Open maximum against Allan Taylor.

Achieved in 5 minutes and 8 seconds, O'Sullivan's maximum in 1997 also holds the record for the fastest maximum in competitive play. Initially Guinness World Records recorded the time at 5 minutes and 20 seconds, but subsequent evidence suggested that the BBC started the timer too early on the break. Depending on the timing methodology used, the break took between 5 minutes 8 seconds and 5 minutes 15 seconds, with both World Snooker and Guinness World Records now officially acknowledging the shorter time.

O'Sullivan also holds the record for the total number of century breaks, compiling more than 1,100 century breaks in professional competition. He scored his 1,100th century in his quarter-final match against John Higgins at the Cazoo Tour Championship of 2021. At the 2022 Scottish Open, O'Sullivan scored a century in 3 minutes 34 seconds — just 3 seconds slower than the fastest televised century break, which was made by Tony Drago in 1996.

Footnotes

References

Further reading

External links

Ronnie O'Sullivan at worldsnooker.com
 Profile at Snooker.org
 

 
1975 births
Living people
People from Wordsley
English snooker players
Masters (snooker) champions
UK champions (snooker)
English pool players
English people of Italian descent
English people of Irish descent
English people of Sicilian descent
Winners of the professional snooker world championship
World number one snooker players
People from Chigwell
Sportspeople from Essex
People educated at Wanstead High School
Labour Party (UK) people
Officers of the Order of the British Empire